The 1924 Ohio State Buckeyes football team represented Ohio State University in the 1924 Big Ten Conference football season. The Buckeyes compiled a 2–3–3 record and were outscored 40–45 by their opponent.

Schedule

Coaching staff
 John Wilce, head coach, 12th year

References

Ohio State
Ohio State Buckeyes football seasons
Ohio State Buckeyes football